Bulgapsan is a mountain of Jeollanam-do, western South Korea. It has an elevation of 516 metres.

See also
List of mountains of Korea

References

Mountains of South Jeolla Province
Yeonggwang County
Hampyeong County
Mountains of South Korea